Callichroma euthalia is a species of beetle in the family Cerambycidae. It was described by Bates in 1879. It is known from Panama, Colombia, and Venezuela.

References

Callichromatini
Beetles described in 1879